InfoSec Institute is a technology training company providing  training courses for security professionals, businesses, agencies and technology professionals.

The company's training library provides multi-course tracks by job function, certification-specific training and short-form, continuing education training. Its course library includes over 95 courses covering topics like ethical hacking, network security, mobile forensics and more.

InfoSec Institute's SecurityIQ integrates security awareness training, phishing simulations and personalized learning. It scales with employees’ security aptitudes, roles and learning styles.

History 
InfoSec Institute was founded in 1998 by a team of information security instructors. 

In June 2022, InfoSec institute was named one of the top 20 online learning library by Training Industry for the fourth consecutive year.

See also 
 Cyber security

References 

Computer security companies
Computer security software companies
Defunct software companies of the United States
Training companies